Mosese Foliaki (born 2000) is a Tongan Athlete who competes in the hurdles, high jump, and pole vault. He has represented Tonga at the Pacific Games and Pacific Mini Games. 

At the 2017 Pacific Mini Games in Port Vila he won silver in the pole vault, and bronze in the high jump. At the 2019 Pacific Games in Apia he won gold in both the 110 metres hurdles and the high jump. Following the games he was granted land in Vavaʻu by governor Lord Fakatulolo.

Foliaki was working as a Mormon missionary on Nomuka during the 2022 Hunga Tonga–Hunga Ha'apai eruption and tsunami, and was involved in rescue efforts after the tsunami.

References

Living people
2000 births
Tongan Latter Day Saints
Tongan hurdlers
Tongan high jumpers
Tongan pole vaulters